Tina Monica Joemat-Pettersson (née Joemat; 18 December 1963 in Kimberley, Northern Cape) is a South African politician and the former Minister of Energy from 25 May 2014 to 31 March 2017. She was previously the Minister of agriculture, forestry, and fisheries from 2009 to 2014.

Early life 
Joemat-Pettersson was born as Tina Monica Joemat on 16 December 1963 in Kimberley, Northern Cape where she attended William Pescord High School. She obtained a Bachelor of Arts degree in English and History from the University of the Western Cape and Higher Diploma in Education from the University of the Western Cape.

Political career
Joemat-Pettersson was active in politics from a young age as a political and labour activist while a student. She campaigned for the African National Congress in the new Northern Cape Province in the first democratic elections in April 1994 and was elected to the province's Legislature where she became a member of it cabinet as MEC for Education, Arts and Culture. At the time she was only 30 years old. She continued to serve as Education MEC for ten years and after 2004 was moved to the portfolio of Agriculture where she continued to serve as an MEC until May 2009 when she moved to the national parliament becoming Minister of Agriculture, Forestry and Fisheries. In May 2014 was appointed to the energy portfolio.

She resigned from Parliament effective 31 March 2017, due to a cabinet reshuffle where she was replaced by Minister Mmamoloko Kubayi. She was the third fired cabinet minister to resign, after Dipuo Peters and former finance deputy minister Mcebisi Jonas.

In December 2017, Joemat-Pettersson was reelected to the African National Congress' 80 member National Executive Committee (NEC) and in January 2018 the NEC elected her to the party's 20 member National Working Committee (NWC).

After the 2019 South African general election, Joemat-Petterson returned to Parliament. She was then elected chairperson of the Portfolio Committee on Police.

On 7 April 2021, she became a member of the Adhoc Committee on Section 194 Enquiry, which will determine if Public Protector Busisiwe Mkhwebane should be removed from office or not.

Controversy

Joemat-Pettersson was found guilty twice by the Public Protector, once in 2012: 
"However, Minister Joemat-Pettersson's defence of ignorance of the costs involved, though accepted, is a cause for serious concern as she displayed a blank cheque attitude towards public funds. Her failure to concern herself with the prudent use of public funds in connection with her accommodation expenses in the said two instances failed to meet the requirements of paragraph 2 of the Executive Ethics Code read with Section 96(2) of the Constitution, which required of her to act in good faith, with integrity and in the best interest of good governance. Therefore, the conclusion that her conduct amounted to reckless use of public funds, was improper and unethical is accordingly justified,"
and a second time in 2014:
"10.7 Regarding Minister Joemat-Pettersson's rejection of the request to defer her planned abrupt handover to the SA Navy an imprudent act which resulted in lack of proper patrols and alleged deterioration of patrol vessels amounting to millions of Rand in refurbishment costs and that this amounts to fruitless and wasteful expenditure and accordingly, improper conduct and maladministration, I intend to find that:
10.7.1 The Minister's rejection of a request to defer her planned abrupt handover to the SA Navy which led to alleged lack of patrols and deterioration of patrol vessels was imprudent and led to fruitless and wasteful expenditure and; 10.7.2 The actions of the Minister constitute improper conduct and maladministration,"
with remedial action suggested:
"11.2.1 The President 11.2.1.1 To consider taking disciplinary action against the Minister for her reckless dealing with state money and services resulting in fruitless and wasteful expenditure, loss of confidence in the fisheries industry in SA and alleged decimation of fisheries resources in SA and delayed quota allocations due to lack of appropriate research."

These were the major findings by the Public Protector after a complaint was received from the Democratic Alliance's Member of Parliament, Pieter van Dalen. The Public Protector is a duly appointed Chapter 9 institution which has the power to investigate and make findings against the Executive government of Republic of South Africa. To date Joemat-Pettersson has not answered to them.

Personal life
Joemat-Pettersson was married to Swedish businessman Thorvald Pettersson, who died in 2006. Together they had two sons, Austin and Terrence.

Offices held
MEC for Education, Northern Cape Province, 1994–2009
Member ANC Deployment Committee, Elections Committee and gender Committee
Member ANC Provincial Executive Committee Northern Cape, 1988
Member ANC, 1989 to present
Member Central Committee SACP, 1998 
Member Northern Cape Provincial HIV and AIDS Council, 2000  
Member Northern Cape provincial Legislature, 1994–2009
Member of the Parliament of South Africa, 2009–2017
Member South African Democratic Teachers Union, 1992  
Member United Democratic Front, 1984–1986
Minister of Agriculture, Forestry and Fisheries, 2009–2014
Minister of Energy, 2014-2017
Research Assistant to Head of English Department, UWC, 1990  
Social Development and Community Services Chair - Northern Cape Province Rehabilitation Trust 2004–present
Teacher Pescodia Secondary School Kimberley, 1987
Treasurer ANC Provincial Executive Committee, 2003
Trustee | Mosiuoa Lekota children's Fund 2005–
Youth Leader Oranjezicht Jewish Children's Home, 1988–1989

Awards
Farmers’ Weekly best Agriculture MEC, 2006 and 2007
Ford Foundation Scholarship
Human Sciences Research Council Merit Bursary

References

External links
 Tina Monica Joemat-Pettersson, Who's Who Southern Africa

1963 births
Living people
People from Kimberley, Northern Cape
Cape Coloureds
South African Communist Party politicians
African National Congress politicians
Government ministers of South Africa
Members of the National Assembly of South Africa
University of the Western Cape alumni
Agriculture and land affairs ministers of South Africa
Women government ministers of South Africa
Women members of the National Assembly of South Africa